Tom Okker and Marty Riessen were the defending champions, but did not participate this year.

Jim McManus and Jim Osborne won the title, defeating Jürgen Fassbender and Karl Meiler 4–6, 6–3, 7–5 in the final.

Seeds

Draw

Finals

Top half

Bottom half

External links
 Draw

1972 Queen's Club Championships